The RPC12 (Remorqueurs Portuaires et Côtiers de 12 tonnes de traction au point fixe, "Harbour and Coastal tugboat, 12-tonne bollard pull") is a type of harbour tugboat operated by the French Navy. They utilise Voith propulsion to develop a 12-tonne bollard pull.

Design and description
The RPC12 has been classified into three sub-types: the original version, called "Type A" (comprising Fréhel and Saire), was designed as a dual-purpose tugboat capable of supporting shipping operations both in harbours and off the coast. After the two first units, the design was simplified, while retaining most functionalities, to reduce cost, yielding the "Type B" (comprising Armen, La Houssaye, Kéréon, Sicié and Taunoa). The nine remaining units constitute the RP12 type, which is further simplified to operate only within harbours (comprising Lardier, Giens, Mengam, Balaguier, Taillat, Nividic, Port Cros, Le Four and Eckmühl). Because of these differing capabilities, the RPC12 of both types are classified "auxiliaries", with an "A"-prefixed pennant number, while the RP12 are considered "yard vessels", with the corresponding "Y"-prefixed pennant numbers.

The latest in the series, Rascas, is an improved high-sea ship with better sonic isolation and air conditioning, or use in tropical waters, and a different radar.

Ships

Citations

External links

 Remorqueurs côtiers de type Fréhel, French Ministry of Defence.

Tugboats of France
Auxiliary tugboat classes
Ship classes of the French Navy